Julia Verlinden (born 18 January 1979) is a German politician of the Alliance 90/The Greens who has been serving as a member of the Bundestag from the state of Lower Saxony since 2017.

Early life and career 
Verlinden grew up near Cologne. She studied environmental sciences at the University of Lüneburg from 1998 to 2005 and graduated with a diploma. From 2006 to December 2012 she was a research associate at the Federal Environment Agency (UBA) in Dessau. From January 2013 until she moved to the Bundestag in October 2013, she headed the Energy Efficiency Division at the Federal Environment Agency.

Political career 
Verlinden became a member of the Bundestag in the 2017 German federal election. In parliament, she is a member of the Committee for Economic Affairs and Energy. She serves as her parliamentary group's spokesperson for energy policy.

Since 2021, Verlinden has been serving as one her parliamentary group's deputy chairs, under the leadership of co-chairs Britta Haßelmann and Katharina Dröge.

Verlinden contested Lüchow-Dannenberg – Lüneburg in 2013, 2017 and 2021.

Other activities 
 Agora Energiewende, Member of the Council (since 2022)
 Federal Bioenergy Association (BBE), Member of the Advisory Board
 German Industry Initiative for Energy Efficiency (DENEFF), Member of the Parliamentary Advisory Board (since 2018)
 German Renewable Energy Federation (BEE), Member of the Parliamentary Advisory Board
 German Federation for the Environment and Nature Conservation (BUND), Member
 German United Services Trade Union (ver.di), Member

References

External links 

  
 Bundestag biography 

1979 births
Living people
Members of the Bundestag for Lower Saxony
Female members of the Bundestag
21st-century German women politicians
Members of the Bundestag 2021–2025
Members of the Bundestag 2017–2021
Members of the Bundestag for Alliance 90/The Greens